Siobhan Fallon may refer to:

 Siobhan Fallon Hogan (born 1961), American actress
 Siobhan Fallon (writer), American writer active 2011–present